Evgenii Dmitriyevich Klimov (born 3 February 1994) is a Russian ski jumper and a former Nordic combined skier. He is the first Russian in history who won an individual ski jumping World Cup event for men. He also took the Grand Prix 2018 overall title in ski jumping. He also has the national record for the longest ski jump with 237m. At the 2022 Olympics, he was part of the mixed team which won the silver medal.

Career

Nordic combined 
Klimov competed at the 2014 Winter Olympics for Russia. He placed 45th in the normal hill Nordic combined event, after being 3rd in the ski jumping portion, and 9th in the team event.

As of September 2014, his best showing at the World Championships is 12th, in the 2013 team event. His best individual finish is 49th, in the 2013 large hill event.

Klimov made his World Cup debut in February 2013. His best individual finish is 30th, at a large hill event at Kuusamo in 2013/14. His best World Cup overall finish is 80th, in 2013/14.

Ski jumping 

He ended his Nordic combined career and switched to a ski jumping career in 2015. He won two medals in ski jumping at the 2015 Winter Universiade in Osrblie, Slovakia. He made a World Cup debut in 2015/16 season.

Klimov won the 2018 FIS Ski Jumping Grand Prix. He then won his first World Cup event in Wisła, becoming the first Russian to achieve that feat.

World Cup

Standings

Individual wins

Individual starts (125)

References

External links 
 (nordic combined profile)
 (ski jumping profile)

1994 births
Living people
Olympic Nordic combined skiers of Russia
Nordic combined skiers at the 2014 Winter Olympics
Sportspeople from Perm, Russia
Russian male Nordic combined skiers
Russian male ski jumpers
Universiade medalists in ski jumping
Ski jumpers at the 2018 Winter Olympics
Ski jumpers at the 2022 Winter Olympics
Olympic ski jumpers of Russia
Universiade gold medalists for Russia
Universiade bronze medalists for Russia
Competitors at the 2015 Winter Universiade
Olympic silver medalists for the Russian Olympic Committee athletes
Medalists at the 2022 Winter Olympics
Olympic medalists in ski jumping